MMA Fighting is a news website that covers the sport of mixed martial arts (MMA). Founded in 2001, the site is notable for its breaking news coverage, podcast series, and The MMA Hour with Ariel Helwani.

Overview 
MMAFighting.com was launched by Ray Hui in 2001, initially as an Angelfire site.

In 2009, MMAFighting.com was acquired by AOL. In 2011, it was sold to their current owners, Vox Media, where they now are a part of SB Nation.

A 2 million unique users per month website reported in 2011, and currently the #3 most popular MMA media & news website worldwide according to Alexa Internet.

Awards 
In the World MMA Awards, MMA Fighting has won the award for "Media Source of the Year" a total of four times, including three consecutively between 2015 and 2017. Additionally, MMA Fighting employee Ariel Helwani has won the award for "MMA Journalist of the Year" every year since 2010.

The MMA Hour 

MMA Fighting hosts The MMA Hour, a twice-weekly show hosted by Ariel Helwani, that features interviews with various names in mixed martial arts, including fighters, promoters, agents, coaches, and journalists.

The MMA Hour was hosted weekly by Ariel Helwani from June 2009 until June 2018. In June 2018, Luke Thomas took over as the host.

In June 2021, Helwani announced his return to MMA Fighting and Vox Media as host for The MMA Hour, with a new twice-weekly schedule.

See also
 Bloody Elbow
 Fightmag
 Inside MMA
 MMAjunkie.com
 Sherdog

References

Mixed martial arts websites
Internet properties established in 2001